Manal is a feminine given name of Arabic origin. Notable people with the name include:

 Manal Benchlikha, known as Manal (singer) (born 1993), Moroccan musical artist
 Manal Al Dowayan (born 1973), Saudi Arabian artist
 Manal bint Mohammed Al Maktoum (born 1977), Emirati royal and politician
 Manal Awad Mikhail, Egyptian veterinarian and governor
 Manal Abdel Samad (born 1975), Lebanese politician
 Manal al-Sharif (born 1979), Saudi Arabian women's rights activist 
 Manal Yunis (born 1929), Iraqi lawyer

Arabic feminine given names